Umaru Musa Yar'Adua  (16 August 19515 May 2010) was a Nigerian politician who was the President of Nigeria from 2007 to 2010. He was declared the winner of the Nigerian presidential election held on 21 April 2007, and was sworn in on 29 May 2007.

He previously served as the governor of Katsina state from 1999 to 2007; and was a member of the Peoples Democratic Party (PDP). In 2009, Yar'Adua left for Saudi Arabia to receive treatment for pericarditis. He returned to Nigeria on 24 February 2010, but died on 5 May.

Early life

Family 
Yar'adua was born in Katsina state, Nigeria. His father, Musa Yar'Adua, was a Minister for Lagos in the First Republic and held the chieftaincy title of Matawalle (custodian of the royal treasury) of the Katsina Emirate, a title which Yar'Adua inherited. His paternal grandfather, Malam Umaru, had also held the title of Matawallen Katsina, while his paternal grandmother, Binta, a Fulani from the Sullubawa clan, was a princess of the Katsina Emirate and a sister of Emir Muhammadu Dikko.

Yar'Adua married Turai Yar'Adua of Katsina state in 1975; they had seven children (five daughters and two sons) and several grandchildren. Their daughter, Zainab, is married to the former Kebbi state governor, Usman Dakingari.

Another daughter, Nafisa is married to Isa Yuguda, a former governor of Bauchi state. Her sister Maryam is married to Ibrahim Shema, Yar'Adua's successor as Katsina state governor. Yar'Adua was also married to Hauwa Umar Radda from 1992 to 1997, and they had two children.

Education 
He started his education at Rafukka Primary School in 1958, and moved to Dutsinma Boarding Primary School in 1962. He attended the Government College at Keffi from 1965 until 1969. In 1971 he received a Higher School Certificate from Barewa College. He attended Ahmadu Bello University in Zaria from 1972 to 1975, where he obtained a bachelor's degree in Education and Chemistry, and then returned in 1978 to pursue a master's degree in Analytical Chemistry.

Pre–presidency
Yar'Adua's first employment was at Holy Child College in Lagos (1975–76). He later served as a lecturer at the College of Arts, Science, and Technology in Zaria, Kaduna state, between 1976 and 1979. In 1979, he began working as a lecturer at College of Art Science, remaining in this position until 1983, when he began working in the corporate sector.

Yar'Adua worked at Sambo Farms Ltd. in Funtua, Katsina state, as its pioneer General Manager, between 1983 and 1989. He served as a board member of Katsina State Farmers' Supply Company between 1984 and 1985, Member of the Governing Council of Katsina College of Arts, Science and Technology Zaria and Katsina Polytechnic, between 1978 and 1983, board chairman of Katsina State Investment and Property Development Company between 1994 and 1996.

He also served as a director of many companies, including Habib Nigeria Bank Ltd, 1995–99; Lodigiani Nigeria Ltd., 1987–99, Hamada Holdings, 1983–99; and Madara Ltd., Vom, Jos, 1987–99. He was Chairman of Nation House Press Ltd., Kaduna, from 1995 to 1999.

Party politics 
During the Second Republic (1979–83), Yar'Adua was a member of the leftist People's Redemption Party, while his father was briefly the National Vice Chairman of the National Party of Nigeria. During the transition programme of General Ibrahim Babangida to the Third Republic, Yar'Adua was one of the foundation members of the Peoples Front of Nigeria with other members such as Atiku Abubakar, Baba Gana Kingibe, Bola Tinubu, Sabo Bakin Zuwo, Wada Abubakar, Abdullahi Aliyu Sumaila, Abubakar Koko and Rabiu Musa Kwankwaso, a political association under the leadership of his elder brother, the late Major-General Shehu Musa Yar'Adua. That association later formed the Social Democratic Party. Yar'Adua was a member of the 1988 Constituent Assembly. He was a member of the party's National Caucus and the Nigerian Social Democratic Party's (SDP) State Secretary in Katsina. He contested for the governorship position in the 1991 election, but lost to Saidu Barda, the candidate of the National Republican Convention and an ally of Ibrahim Babangida.

Governor of Katsina 
In 1999, Yar'Adua won the Katsina state governorship election. He was the first governor to publicly declare his assets. Yar'Adua's administration saw various developments in the state. Katsina became the fifth northern Nigerian state to adopt sharia, or Islamic law. Education was prioritised and several schools were built in local areas. Yar'Adua also delivered on his promise of running an efficient public administration, with corruption significantly hampered. In 2003, he was re-elected for a second term in office and his successor was Ibrahim Shema.

2007 presidential election 

Between 16–17 December 2006, Yar'Adua was chosen as the presidential candidate of the ruling People's Democratic Party for the April 2007 election, receiving 3,024 votes from party delegates; his closest rival, Rochas Okorocha, received 372 votes. Yar'Adua's success in the primary election was attributed to the support of incumbent President Olusegun Obasanjo; At the time of his nomination, he was an obscure figure on the national stage, and has been described as a "puppet" of Obasanjo, who could not have won the nomination under fair circumstances. Shortly after his nomination, Yar'Adua chose Goodluck Jonathan, governor of Bayelsa state, as his vice-presidential candidate. Another view regarding the support he received from President Olusegun Obasanjo is that, he was one of few serving governors with a spotless record, devoid of any suspicions or charges of corruption. He also belonged to the People's Democratic Movement (PDM) – a powerful political block, founded by his late brother, Shehu Musa Yar'Adua, who was also Obasanjo's vice president during his military rule.

In the presidential election held on 21 April 2007, Yar'Adua won 70% of the votes ( votes) according to official results released on 23 April. The election was highly controversial. Strongly criticized by observers, as well as the two primary opposition candidates, Muhammadu Buhari of the All Nigeria Peoples Party (ANPP) and Atiku Abubakar of the Action Congress (AC), the result was largely rejected as having been rigged in Yar'Adua's favour.

Presidency

After the election, Yar'Adua proposed a government of national unity. In late June 2007, two opposition parties, the ANPP and the Progressive Peoples Alliance (PPA), agreed to join Yar'Adua's government.

Cabinet 
Yar'Adua's new cabinet was sworn in on 26 July 2007. It included 39 ministers, including two for the ANPP.

National agenda 
In August 2007, the administration unveiled a seven-point agenda to be the focal point of the administration's solution to developmental challenges and stated goal of elevating Nigeria to be among the twenty largest economies in the world by 2020:

 Infrastructure, power and energy
 Food security
Wealth creation
Transport
Land reforms 
Security 
Education

Due to his illness and death, the administration was unable to realise the agenda. The power sector was not adequately funded, infrastructural deficit was not closed down and the troublesome process of reforming land use regulations hampered a reform of the land tenure law.

Electoral reforms 
Umar musa Yaradua established a presidential electoral reform committee to look into the legal factors, social and political institutions and security issues that affects the quality and credibility of elections in the country and also, to make recommendations on improving the credibility of elections. The reform committee was headed by Muhammadu Uwais, a former Chief Justice of the Supreme Court. Among the recommendations of the committee was constitutional measures to make INEC truly independent, removing some of the activities of INEC with the creation of an electoral  commission and a parties registration agency. It also recommended speedy resolution of legal challenges of elections, presumably before the swearing in ceremony of the victor of the seat being challenged.

Illness 
President Yar'Adua left Nigeria on 23 November 2009, and was reported to be receiving treatment for pericarditis at a clinic in Saudi Arabia. He was not seen in public again, and his absence created a power vacuum which was usurped by a cabal. On 22 January 2010, the Supreme Court of Nigeria ruled that the Federal Executive Council (FEC) had fourteen days to decide a resolution on whether Yar'Adua was "incapable of discharging the functions of his office". The ruling also stated that the Federal Executive Council should hear testimony of five doctors, one of whom should be Yar'Adua's personal physician.

Doctrine of necessity 
On 10 February 2010, the Senate controversially used the "doctrine of necessity" to transfer Presidential Powers to Vice President Goodluck Jonathan, and declared him Acting President, with all the accompanying powers, until Yar'Adua returned to full health. The power transfer, considered illegal by some, has been called a "coup without the word" by opposition lawyers and lawmakers. However, there are others that felt the power vacuum would lead to instability and a possible military takeover.

Personal life

Health 
In 2007, Umaru Yar'Adua, who suffered from a kidney condition, challenged his critics to a game of squash in an endeavor to end speculations about his health. On 6 March 2007 he was flown to Germany for medical reasons, further fomenting rumors about his health. His spokesperson said this was due to stress and quoted Yar'Adua as saying he was fine and would soon be back to campaigning. Another report, which was rejected by Yar'Adua's spokesperson, claims that Yar'Adua collapsed after suffering a possible heart attack.

Wealth 
On 28 June 2007, Yar'Adua publicly revealed his declaration of assets from May (becoming the first Nigerian president to do so), according to which he had ₦856,452,892 (US$) in assets,  of which belonged to his wife. He also had ₦88,793,269.77 in liabilities. This disclosure, which fulfilled a pre-election promise he made, was intended to set an example for other Nigerian politicians and discourage corruption.

Death and aftermath

On 24 February 2010, Yar'Adua returned to Abuja under the cover of darkness. His state of health was unclear, but there was speculation that he was still on a life support machine. Various political and religious figures in Nigeria had visited him during his illness saying he would make a recovery. Yar'Adua died on 5 May at the Aso Rock Presidential Villa. An Islamic burial took place on 6 May in his hometown in Katsina.

The Federal Government of Nigeria declared a seven-day mourning period. Acting President Goodluck Jonathan said "Nigeria has lost the jewel on its crown and even the heavens mourn with our nation tonight. As individuals and as a nation we prayed for the recovery of Mr President. But we take solace in the fact that the Almighty is the giver and taker of all life."

US President Barack Obama offered condolences, stating: "He was committed to creating lasting peace and prosperity within Nigeria's own borders, and continuing that work will be an important part of honoring his legacy."

See also

Shehu Musa Yar'Adua, his elder brother
Olusegun Obasanjo
Goodluck Jonathan

References

External links

Umaru Musa Yar'Adua: Vision for the Future

Latest Music & Entertainment

|-

|-

|-

1951 births
2010 deaths
Presidents of Nigeria
Governors of Katsina State
Nigerian Muslims
Nigerian Fula people
Ahmadu Bello University alumni
Social Democratic Party (Nigeria) politicians
People's Redemption Party politicians
Peoples Democratic Party presidents of Nigeria
People from Katsina
Burials in Katsina State
Umaru
Barewa College alumni
Candidates in the Nigerian general election, 2007
Peoples Democratic Party state governors of Nigeria
Politicians from Katsina